Chermasan (Särmäsän) is a rural locality (a village) in Usen-Ivanovsky Selsoviet, Belebeyevsky District, Bashkortostan, Russia. The population was 19 as of 2010. There are 2 streets.

Geography 
Chermasan is located 38 km northeast of Belebey (the district's administrative centre) by road. Kuryatmasovo is the nearest rural locality.

References 

Rural localities in Belebeyevsky District